Acinodrillia viscum is a species of sea snail, a marine gastropod mollusk in the family Drilliidae.

Description
The length of the white, claviform shell varies between 7.2 mm and 8.9 mm; its width is 3.1 mm. The spiral sculpture of the shell shows sharply incised grooves, carving through the strong, raised axial ribs into distinct, coarse nodules.

Distribution
This marine species occurs along East Transkei, South Africa.

References

External links
 BioLib: Acinodrillia viscum

Endemic fauna of South Africa
viscum
Gastropods described in 1988